Raja Haji Abdullah Airport  is a domestic airport serving Tanjung Balai Karimun, on the Great Karimun island, in the Riau Islands Province of Indonesia.

Airlines and destinations

Statistic

References

Airports in the Riau Islands